Vittoria Fontana (born 23 July 2000) is an Italian sprinter. She competed at the 2020 Summer Olympics, in 100 m.

Personal best
100 m: 11.33 (Geneva, Switzerland, 12 June 2021)

Achievements
Senior level

National titles
 Italian Athletics Indoor Championships
 60 metres: 2021

See also
Italian all-time top lists - 100 metres

References

External links
 

2000 births
Athletics competitors of Centro Sportivo Carabinieri
Italian female sprinters
Living people
Italian Athletics Championships winners
Athletes (track and field) at the 2020 Summer Olympics
Olympic female sprinters
Olympic athletes of Italy
People from Gallarate
Sportspeople from the Province of Varese
21st-century Italian women